Shantee De'Shjuan Orr (born May 28, 1981) is a former American football linebacker. He was  signed by the Green Bay Packers as an undrafted free agent in 2003. He played college football at Michigan.

Orr has also played for the Houston Texans, Jacksonville Jaguars and the Cleveland Browns.

Early life and education
Orr graduated from Denby Technical & Prep. H.S. in June 1999.
He was a member of the National Honors Society.
In football, he earned All-State and USA Today Honorable Mention All-America Honors as a senior. He also ranked number one in state as a Linebacker. In his senior year he played linebacker, guard, quarterback, tight end and punter… He also lettered in baseball and track, winning city discuss title as a sophomore.

Career

Collegiate
Orr played college football at the University of Michigan, and was a starter for three seasons starting 23 of 35 career games at defensive end. He finished his career with 79 tackles, 13 sacks, nine passes defended and three forced fumbles.
As a junior, he registered 24 tackles and 6 sacks…
He collected a career-high 35 tackles and 6 sacks as a sophomore…
He also recorded 20 tackles and 1 sack in 2000 after redshirting in 1999.
He majored in Movement Science.

Professional

Green Bay Packers
After going undrafted in the 2003 NFL Draft, Orr signed with the Green Bay Packers on May 2, 2003. On July 29, 2003, he was waived by the Packers.

Houston Texans
Orr was claimed by the Houston Texans on July 30, 2003. He appeared in six games that season and made his NFL debut at the Buffalo Bills on November 16.
In 2004, Orr played in four games mainly on special teams.
In 2005, Orr jumped into the starting lineup playing in all 16 games and starting 12 of them. He amassed 47 tackles and led the Texans with seven and a half sacks. In one game vs. Baltimore he set a team record of 3 sacks in one game.
In 2006, Orr played in all 16 games starting 14 of the contests. He ended the year with 27 tackles and 1.5 sacks.
In 2007, Orr began the 2007 season with the Houston Texans appearing in six games and starting one. He was waived on November 28.

Jacksonville Jaguars
Orr was signed Jacksonville Jaguars on December 12 and played in three games making three tackles.

Cleveland Browns
On March 21, Orr signed with the Cleveland Browns. He was released by the team on August 30 during final cuts. However, he was re-signed by the team on September 4 after linebacker Antwan Peek was injured in practice and placed on injured reserve.  Orr was not re-signed following the 2008 season.

References

External links
Cleveland Browns bio
Jacksonville Jaguars bio

1981 births
Living people
Denby High School alumni
American football linebackers
Michigan Wolverines football players
Green Bay Packers players
Houston Texans players
Jacksonville Jaguars players
Cleveland Browns players
Players of American football from Detroit